McKelvey is a surname.

McKelvey may also refer to:
McKelvey (horse), a racehorse
McKelvey Valley, a valley in Antarctica
Mount McKelvey, a mountain in Antarctica
McKelvey Foundation, an American charitable organization